The men's football tournament at the 2018 Asian Games was held from 10 August to 1 September 2018. It was the 17th edition of the men's tournament. In this tournament, 25 teams played in the men's competition. South Korea were the gold medal holders when they won the tournament in 2014. They managed to retain their title.

Competition schedule
The match schedule of the men's tournament was unveiled on 15 February 2018.

Venues
The tournament was held in four venues across four cities.

Squads

Each nation must submit a squad of 20 players, 17 of whom must be born on or after 1 January 1995, and three of whom can be older dispensation players.

Draw
The draw for the tournament was held on 5 July 2018 with initially 24 teams involved. The teams were seeded into four pots based on their performances in the previous Asian Games in 2014. The hosts Indonesia were automatically assigned into position A1.

However, the initial draw result was scratched because the UAE and Palestine were omitted, so the draw result had to be reconfirmed on 25 July 2018, and the ceremony reopened in Kuala Lumpur, Malaysia at 3:00 p.m. local time (7:00 a.m. GMT). Palestine were added to Group A and the UAE were added to Group E.

Iraq, which were initially placed in Group C, later withdrew from the tournament. To re-balance the groups so that every group has at least four teams, another re-draw was held on 3 August 2018 to determine which of Palestine or UAE would be moved to Group C to replace Iraq. The UAE were drawn.

Group stage
The top two teams in each group, and the four third-placed teams among six groups advance to the round of 16.

All times are local, WIB (UTC+7).

Tiebreakers
Teams in a group are ranked according to points (3 points for a win, 1 point for a draw, 0 points for a loss), and if tied on points, the following tiebreaking criteria are applied, in the order given, to determine the rankings.
Highest number of points obtained in all group matches;
Highest number of points obtained in the group matches between the teams concerned;
Goal difference resulting from the group matches between the teams concerned;
Highest number of goals scored from all group matches between the teams concerned;
If two or more teams have equal ranking with the criteria so far, reapply the criteria above only for them. If this re-application gives no more ranking, apply the following criteria.
Goal difference in all group matches;
Highest number of goals scored in all group matches;
Kicks from the penalty mark only if two (2) teams are involved and they are both on the field of play.
Fewer points of yellow/red cards in all group matches (only one of these deductions shall be applied to a player in a single match): 
Drawing of lots

Third-placed teams from the three groups are ranked according to the following criteria, after the result against the fifth-placed team of group A are excluded in order to rank them with the same numbers of matches.
Highest number of points obtained in all group matches;
Goal difference in all group matches;
Highest number of goals scored in all group matches;
Fewer points of yellow/red cards in all group matches (only one of these deductions shall be applied to a player in a single match): 
Drawing of lots

Group A

Group B

Group C

Group D

Group E

Group F

Ranking of third-placed teams
In order to ensure equality when comparing the third-placed team of all groups, the result of the match against the 5th-placed team in Group A was ignored due to the other groups having only four teams.

Knockout stage
In the knockout stage, extra time and penalty shoot-out would be used to decide the winner if necessary, except for the third place match where penalty shoot-out (no extra time) would be used to decide the winner if necessary.

Bracket

Round of 16

Quarter-finals

Semi-finals

Bronze medal match

Gold medal match

Statistics

Goalscorers

Final standing

See also
Football at the 2018 Asian Games – Women's tournament

References

External links
Official website

Men